The San Francisquito Formation is a geologic formation in northern Los Angeles County, California.

Areas where it is exposed include: San Francisquito Canyon of the Sierra Pelona Mountains, and the northwestern side of the Devil's Punchbowl gorge in the San Gabriel Mountains.

Geology 
The San Francisquito Formation is from marine deposits of the Late Cretaceous period of the Mesozoic Era, and the Early Paleocene epoch in the Paleogene period of the Cenozoic Era.  It is overlain by the Punchbowl Formation (east) and Castaic Formation (west), both of the Miocene and Pliocene epochs.  It overlies the crystalline San Gabriel Basement Complex.

It is found between the San Andreas Fault on its north, and the Devil's Punchbowl Fault on its south. The Pliocene epoch Crowder Formation is to the northeast.

Fossil content 
It preserves fossils dating back to the Paleogene period.

See also 
 
 List of fossiliferous stratigraphic units in California
 Paleontology in California
 Neenach Volcano

References 

Geologic formations of California
Cretaceous California
Paleogene California
Maastrichtian Stage of North America
Danian Stage
Cretaceous–Paleogene boundary
Shale formations
Geology of Los Angeles County, California
San Gabriel Mountains
Sierra Pelona Ridge